RS:X is a windsurfing class selected by the ISAF to replace the Mistral One Design Class for the 2008 Summer Olympics. The discipline has similarities to Formula Windsurfing - mainly in that the equipment used was designed to allow windsurfing in low and moderate wind conditions with good performance.

RS:X equipment includes a board with a daggerboard, and a sail of a specified size. The board measures 286 cm in length and 93 cm in width. Unlike formula boards, it is quite heavy at 15.5 kg, which is almost twice that of regular competition formula boards, but is very similar to the weight of raceboards such as the previous Olympic board, Mistral One Design Class.  The Mistral board has a weight of 17 kg ready to sail, while the RS:X board weighs more than 19 kg.

The shape and design of the RS:X sail is based on that of the Neil Pryde windsurfing sail V8.

Starting with the 2024 Summer Olympics the IQFoil class has been selected to replace RS:X.

Events

Olympics

Men

Women

World Championships

RS:X World Championships

Men

Women

Youth
The RS:X Class hold Youth World Championships the age limit used is typically for sailors under 21

Youth Male

Youth Female

Youth Sailing World Championships

The RS:X has been used as equipment in the Youth Sailing World Championships which is for sailors under 19.

Boys

Girls

See also 
 Neil Pryde

References

External links

 Neil Pryde official website
 RS:X Official Site
 ISAF RS:X Microsite

 
Classes of World Sailing
Windsurfing boards
Olympic sailing classes